Aethiopsestis austrina is a moth in the family Drepanidae. It was described by Watson in 1965. It is found in Zimbabwe and South Africa.

Subspecies
Aethiopsestis austrina austrina (Zimbabwe)
Aethiopsestis austrina nebulosa Watson, 1965 (South Africa)

References

Moths described in 1965
Thyatirinae
Moths of Africa